The Clink of Ice is a 2010 French black comedy film written and directed by Bertrand Blier. The plot centers on Charles (Jean Dujardin), an alcoholic writer who is confronted by an incarnation of his own cancer (Albert Dupontel). The film's original French title is Le Bruit des glaçons, which literally means "The noise of ice cubes".

Cast
 Jean Dujardin as Charles
 Albert Dupontel as Charles' cancer
 Anne Alvaro as Louisa
 Myriam Boyer as Louisa's cancer
 Christa Theret as Evguenia
 Audrey Dana as Carole
 Emile Berling as Stanislas Faulque
 Jean Dell as The oncologist
 Damien Bonnard as Yob 2

Production
The budget was around 7 million Euro, including money from the TV channel France 2. Filming started 30 November 2009 and ended seven weeks later in Anduze, close to Nîmes, southern France. Major film studio Pathé was originally involved but left the production in the summer 2009.

Reception
Review aggregation website Rotten Tomatoes reported an approval rating of 80%, based on 5 reviews, with an average score of 5.5/10.

Accolades

References

External links
 

2010 films
Films directed by Bertrand Blier
2010s French-language films
French black comedy films
2010 black comedy films
Films about alcoholism
Films about cancer in France
Films featuring a Best Supporting Actress César Award-winning performance
2010s French films